A lady-in-waiting or court lady is a female personal assistant at a court, attending on a royal woman or a high-ranking noblewoman. Historically, in Europe, a lady-in-waiting was often a noblewoman but of lower rank than the woman to whom she attended. Although she may either have received a retainer or may not have received compensation for the service she rendered, a lady-in-waiting was considered more of a secretary, courtier, or companion to her mistress than a servant.

In other parts of the world, the lady-in-waiting, often referred to as palace woman, was in practice a servant or a slave rather than a high-ranking woman, but still had about the same tasks, functioning as companion and secretary to her mistress. In courts where polygamy was practised, a court lady was formally available to the monarch for sexual services, and she could become his wife, consort, courtesan, or concubine.

Lady-in-waiting or court lady is often a generic term for women whose relative rank, title, and official functions varied, although such distinctions were also often honorary. A royal woman may or may not be free to select her ladies, and, even when she has such freedom, her choices are usually heavily influenced by the sovereign, her parents, her husband, or the sovereign's ministers (for example, in the Bedchamber crisis).

History
The development of the office of lady-in-waiting in Europe is connected to that of the development of a royal court. During the Carolingian Empire, in the 9th century, Hincmar describes the royal household of Charles the Bald in the De Ordine Palatii, from 882, in which he states that court officials took orders from the queen as well as the king. Merovingian Queens are assumed to have had their personal servants, and in the 9th century it is confirmed that Carolingian Queens had an entourage of guards from the nobility as a sign of their dignity, and some officials are stated to belong to the queen rather than the king.

In the late 12th century, the Queens of France are confirmed to have had their own household, and noblewomen are mentioned as ladies-in-waiting. During the Middle Ages, however, the household of a European queen consort was normally small, and the number of actually employed ladies-in-waiting, rather than wives of noblemen accompanying their husbands to court, was very small: in 1286, the Queen of France had only five ladies-in-waiting in her employment, and it was not until 1316 that her household was separated from that of the royal children.

The role of ladies-in-waiting in Europe changed dramatically during the age of the Renaissance, when a new ceremonial court life, where women played a significant part, developed as representation of power in the courts of Italy, and spread to Burgundy, from Burgundy to France, and to the rest of the courts of Europe. The court of the Duchy of Burgundy was the most elaborate in Europe in the 15th century and became an example for France when the French royal court expanded in the late 15th century and introduced new offices for both men and women to be able to answer to the new renaissance ideal. From small circle of married Femmes and unmarried Filles, with a relatively humble place in the background during the Middle Ages, the number of French ladies-in-waiting were rapidly expanded, divided into an advanced hierarchy with several offices and given an important and public role to play in the new ceremonial court life in early 16th century France. This example was followed by other courts in Europe, when Courts expanded and became more ceremonial during the 16th century, and the offices, numbers and visibility of women expanded in the early modern age.

During the late 19th century and the early 20th century, however, most European courts started to reduce their court staff, often due to new economic and political circumstances which made court representation more questionable.

Duties
The duties of ladies-in-waiting varied from court to court, but functions historically discharged by ladies-in-waiting included proficiency in the etiquette, languages, dances, horse riding, music making, and painting prevalent at court; keeping her mistress abreast of activities and personages at court; care of the rooms and wardrobe of her mistress; secretarial tasks; supervision of servants, budget and purchases; reading correspondence to her mistress and writing on her behalf; and discreetly relaying messages upon command.

By court

Austria
In the late Middle Ages, when the court of the Emperor no longer moved around constantly, the household of the Empress, as well as the equivalent household of the German princely consorts, started to develop a less fluid and more strict organisation with set court offices.

The court model of the Duchy of Burgundy, as well as the Spanish court model, came to influence the organisation of the Austrian imperial court during the 16th century, when the Burgundian Netherlands, Spain and Austria were united through the House of Habsburg. However, during the tenure of Maria of Austria, Holy Roman Empress in the mid-16th century, the court of the Empress was organised in accordance with the Spanish court model, and after she left Austria, there was no further household of an Empress until the 1610s. This resulted in a mix of Burgundian and Spanish customs when the Austrian court model was created.

In 1619, a set organisation was finally established for the Austrian imperial court, which came to be the characteristic organisation of the Austrian-Habsburg court roughly kept from this point onward. Second rank belonged to the Ayas, essentially governesses of the imperial children and heads of the children's court. The Austrian court model was the role model for the princely courts in Germany. The German court model in turn became the role model of the early modern Scandinavian Courts of Denmark and Sweden.

Belgium
The Kingdom of Belgium was founded in 1830, after which a royal court was founded, and ladies-in-waiting were appointed for Louise of Orléans when she became the first queen of Belgium in 1832.

The ladies-in-waiting have historically been chosen by the queen herself from the noblewomen of the Catholic Noble Houses of Belgium. The chief functions at court were undertaken by members of the higher nobility, involving much contact with the royal ladies. Belgian princesses were assigned a lady upon their 18th birthdays. When the queen entertains, the ladies welcome guests and assist the hostess in sustaining conversation.

Cambodia
In Cambodia, the term ladies-in-waiting refers to high ranking female servants who served food and drink, fanned and massaged, and sometimes provided sexual services to the King. Conventionally, these women could work their way up from maids to ladies-in-waiting, concubines, or even queen.  is the Cambodian term for the Khmer lady-in-waiting.

The six favorite court ladies of King Sisowath of Cambodia were probably initially drawn from the ranks of classical royal dancers of the lower class. He was noted for having the most classical dancers as concubines. The imperial celestial dancer, Apsara, was one of these. This practice of drawing from the ranks of royal dancers began in the Golden Age of the Khmer Kingdom.

Canada
Several Canadian ladies-in-waiting have also been appointed to the Royal Household of Canada. Canadian ladies-in-waiting are typically appointed in order to assist the Queen of Canada when carrying out official duties in Canada and royal tours in the country. Five Canadian ladies-in-waiting were made Lieutenants of the Royal Victorian Order.

China

Han
The ladies-in-waiting in China, referred to as palace women, palace ladies or court ladies, were all formally, if not always in practice, a part of the Emperor's harem, regardless of their task, and could be promoted by him to the rank of official concubine, consort, or even empress.

The Emperors of the Han dynasty (202 BC–220 AD) are reported to have had a harem of thousands of 'palace women', although the actual numbers are unconfirmed.

Song
At least during the Song dynasty (960–1279), palace women were divided in three groups: imperial women (consisting of concubines and consorts), imperial daughters (consisting of daughters and sisters of the Emperor), and the female officials and assistants, who performed a wide range of tasks and could potentially be promoted to the rank of concubine or consort.

Women from official elite families could be chosen to become Empress, consort or concubine immediately upon their entrance in the palace, but the Emperor could also promote any female court official to that post, as they were officially all members of his harem.

The female court officials and attendants were normally selected from trusted families and then educated for their task.

Ming
During the Ming dynasty (1368–1644), palace women were sorted into roughly the same three categories as in the Song Dynasty. However, female officials and assistants in the Ming Dynasty were organized into six established government groups, called the Six Bureaus: the Bureau of General Affairs, Bureau of Handicrafts, Bureau of Ceremonies, Bureau of Apartments, Bureau of Apparel, and Bureau of Foodstuffs. These groups were all overseen by the Office of Staff Surveillance, headed by a female official.

Women workers in the imperial palace were distinguished as either permanent or temporary staff. Permanent palace staff included educated and literate female officials serving in the Six Bureaus, and wet nurses caring for imperial heirs or other palace children. These women received great wealth and social acclaim if their jobs were performed well. Seasonal or temporary palace women included midwives, female physicians, and indentured contractors (these were usually women serving as maids to consorts, entertainers, sewing tutors, or sedan-chair bearers). These women were recruited into the palace when necessary and then released following the termination of their predetermined period of service.

Throughout the Ming dynasty, there was frequent movement between the palace service industry and the low levels of the Imperial Harem. Although Emperors frequently selected minor consorts from Imperial serving women, few selected women ever reached the higher ranks of the consort structure or gained significant prominence.

As the Ming dynasty progressed, living and working conditions for palace women began to deteriorate. Lower-ranked serving women working in the Imperial palace were often underpaid and unable to buy food, leaving them to support themselves by selling embroidery at the market outside the palace via eunuchs. Overall, living conditions and punishments for misbehaving eventually grew so bad that there was an assassination attempt against the Jiajing Emperor by a group of serving women. Led by palace maid Yang Jinying in 1542, the failed assassination attempt involved several maids sneaking into the Emperor's bedchamber as he slept, to strangle him with a curtain cord. The attempt ultimately failed, and all the women involved were put to death, although this type of violent revolt by serving women had never been seen before in the Ming Dynasty.

Due to slanderous literary propaganda written and spread by male officials and Confucian authors, higher-class female officials also saw their power begin to weaken throughout the Ming dynasty. These prominent government men began to disparage having educated women in government and state roles in response to the influence Imperial women had held over the nation in the past. This prompted a gradual overtaking of female official roles by palace eunuchs that continued throughout the remainder of the Dynasty.

Qing
The system of palace women continued mostly unchanged during the Qing dynasty (1644–1912), when a class of imperial women acting as consorts or concubines, who had not previously held other roles, existed. However, female court attendants were also all available for promotion to concubinage or the position of consort by the Emperor. During the Qing dynasty, imperial women were selected from among the teenage daughters of the Manchu official banner families, who were drafted to an inspection before they could marry. Similarly, palace maids were drafted from lower official and banner classes before they could marry. After their selection, palace maids were educated as personal attendants to consorts, female officials within court rituals or other tasks, and were also available for the Emperor to promote to consort or concubine. Below the palace maids were the maidservants, who were selected the same way by a draft among the daughters of soldiers.

Denmark
The early modern Danish court was organized according to the German court model, in turn inspired by the Austrian imperial court model, from the 16th century onward. They were followed by the non-noble female court employees not ranking as ladies-in-waiting, such as the chamber maids.

This hierarchy was roughly in place from the 16th century until the death of King Christian IX of Denmark in 1906.

France

The Queen of France is confirmed to have had a separate household in the late 12th century, and an ordinance from 1286 notes that Joan I of Navarre, Queen of France, had a group of five ladies and maids-in-waiting. However, the Queen's household and the number of female courtiers during the Middle Ages was very small in France, as in most European courts.

It was not until the end of the 15th century and early 16th century that emulation of the new courts of the Italian Renaissance made ladies-in-waiting fashionable in official court ceremonies and representation, and female court offices became more developed and numerous in the French court as well as in other European courts. The introduction of ladies-in-waiting increased in great numbers at the French court at this time: from a mere five in 1286 and still only 23 in 1490, to 39 in 1498 and roughly 54 during the 16th century. This expansion of female presence at court has been attributed to both Anne of Brittany, who encouraged all male courtiers to send their daughters to her, and to Francis I of France, who was criticized for bringing to court "the constant presence" of large crowds of women, who gossiped and interfered in state affairs. Francis I once said: "a court without ladies is a court without a court".

The  and the Governess of the Children of France were the only female office holders in France to give an oath of loyalty to the King himself. This office was created in 1619, and was vacant from the death of Marie Anne de Bourbon, in 1741, until the appointment of Marie Louise of Savoy-Carignan, Princesse de Lamballe, in 1775.
This post was created in 1523 and had originally been the highest female court office.
This post was created in 1534.
The  had the keys to the Queen's rooms and could recommend and deny audiences to her, which in practice made her position very powerful at court.

During the Bourbon Restoration, Marie Thérèse of France restored the pre-revolutionary court hierarchy. During the Second Empire, the female courtiers of the Empress were composed of the first rank, and the second rank, followed by six (later twelve) .

Germany
The early modern princely courts in Germany were modeled after the Austrian imperial court model. The German princely courts in turn became the role model of the Scandinavian courts of Denmark and Sweden in the 16th century.

Greece
During the Byzantine Empire, the Byzantine Empress was attended by a female court (the ), which consisted mostly of the wives of high-ranking male court officials, who simply used the feminine versions of their husbands' titles.

The Kingdom of Greece was established in 1832 and its first queen, Amalia of Oldenburg, organized the ladies-in-waiting of its first royal court with one 'Grande Maitresse', followed by the second rank , and the third rank .

Italy

Naples and the Two Sicilies
Prior to the unification, the greatest of the Italian states was the Kingdom of Naples, later called Kingdom of the Two Sicilies.

Kingdom of Italy
In 1861, the Italian Peninsula was united in to the Kingdom of Italy.

Japan

In Japan, the imperial court offices was normally reserved for members of the court aristocracy and the ladies-in-waiting or 'palace attendants' were commonly educated members of the nobility.

During the Heian period (794–1185) women could hold court offices of substantial responsibility, managing the affairs of the Emperor. Female palace attendants were employed by the Imperial Bureau of Palace Attendants from among the court aristocracy, but were required to have sufficient education in Chinese classics to be accepted.

During the Sengoku period (1467–1603), the highest rank of a lady-in-waiting was the 'Female Assistant to the Major Counselor', who ran the affairs of the daily life of the Imperial Household. Ladies-in-waiting acted as imperial secretaries and noted the events at court, visitors and gifts in the official court journals.

In contrast to China, female palace attendants managed the palace of the imperial harem rather than eunuchs, and could hold high court offices in the Emperor's personal household.

Female palace attendants were divided in two classes, which in turn had several ranks, signifying their task. The ladies-in-waiting worked as personal assistants, tending to the Emperor's wardrobe, assisting the emperor's baths, serving meals, performing and attending court rituals. Ladies-in-waiting could be appointed as concubines, consorts or even Empresses by the Emperor or the heir to the throne. The function of a lady-in-waiting as potential concubine was abolished in 1924.

Korea
Gungnyeo (literally 'palace women') is a term that refers to women who worked in the palace and waited upon the king and other members of the royal family.

Gungnyeo consisted of the ladies-in-waiting—both high-ranking court ladies and the ordinary maids (known as nain) responsible for most of the labour work—who were divided into ranks from 9 to 5 (the ranks from 4 to 1 were the official concubines of the king), with two levels each (senior and junior), the highest attainable rank being sanggung (senior 5th), as well as other types of working women who were not included in the classification, such as musuri (women from the lowest class who did odd jobs, such as drawing water and distributing firewood), gaksimi (also known as bija and bangja, who were personal servants of a sanggung), sonnim (literally translated to 'guest', were maids brought in the palace to work for the royal concubines, most of the time connected to the families of the concubines) and uinyeo (selected from public female slaves, they worked at the royal infirmary or public clinics, and practiced simple medicine skills).

Generally, the ladies-in-waiting were chosen from among the young girls of the sangmin (commoners) and the private female slaves of the sadaebu (governing class). Later, the candidates were also picked from among the government slaves, together with the daughters of noblemen's concubines (who were former courtesans or slaves). The appointment process was different for nain associated with the inner quarters for the king and queen, who were recruited by the high ranked court ladies themselves, through recommendations and connections. The nain for the departments with specific skills such as sewing and embroidery were from the jungin (middle class), with the lowest class of gungnyeo coming from the cheonmin (vulgar commoners).

They could be as young as 4 when entering the palace, and after learning court language and etiquette, they could be elevated to a nain. When they had served the court for more than 15 years, they would eventually be promoted to higher ranks, however they were eligible for the rank of sanggung only after a minimum of 35 years of work.

Ladies-in-waiting could become concubines if the king favored them. They would be elevated to the highest rank (senior 5th) and would be known as seungeun sanggung (or 'favored/special court lady'). If they gave birth to a son, they would become members of the royal family, after being promoted to sug-won (junior 4th) and until the 18th century, they could advance as high as becoming queen (the most notable example being Jang Ok-jeong, a concubine of Sukjong of Joseon and mother of Gyeongjong of Joseon).

The Netherlands
The court of the Duchy of Burgundy, which was situated in the Netherlands in the 15th century, was famous for its elaborate ceremonial court life and became a role model for several other courts of Europe. The Burgundian court model came to be the role model for the Austrian imperial court during the 16th century, when the Burgundian Netherlands and Austria were united through the Habsburg dynasty.

The Kingdom of the Netherlands was founded in 1815, signifying the organisation of a royal court.

Beatrix of the Netherlands had a total of seven . They accompanied the queen and the other female members of the Royal House during visits and receptions at the royal court. The monarch paid for their expenses, but they did not receive any salary. Not all of these ladies were members of the Dutch aristocracy, but each had a "notable" husband. After their voluntary retirement,  were appointed to the honorary royal household.

The  (Grandmistress) is the highest-ranking lady at the royal court. From 1984 until 2014, the position was held by Martine van Loon-Labouchere, descendant of the famous banker family, a former diplomat and the widow of  Maurits van Loon of the famous Amsterdam canal estate. The current  is Bibi Countess van Zuylen van Nijevelt-den Beer Poortugael (lady-in-waiting between 2011 and 2014).

Nigeria
A number of tribes and cultural areas in the African continent, such as the Lobedu people of Southern Africa, had a similar custom on ladies-in-waiting in historic times.

As a further example, within certain pre-colonial states of the Bini and Yoruba peoples in Nigeria, the queen mothers and high priestesses were considered "ritually male" due to their social eminence. As a result of this fact, they were often attended on by women who belonged to their harems in much the same way as their actually male counterparts were served by women who belonged to theirs. Although these women effectively functioned as ladies-in-waiting, were often members of powerful families of the local nobility in their own right, and were not usually used for sexual purposes, they were none-the-less referred to as their principals' "wives".

Norway
During the Denmark–Norway Union, from 1380 until 1814, the Danish royal court in Copenhagen was counted as the Norwegian royal court, and thus there was no royal court present in Norway during this period. During the union between Norway and Sweden from 1814 to 1905, there were Norwegian courtiers who served during the Swedish royal family's visits to Norway. The female courtiers were appointed according to the Swedish court model, that is to say the class of Hovfröken (Maid of Honour), Kammarfröken (Chief Maid of Honour) and Statsfru (Lady of the Bedchamber), all supervised by the Overhoffmesterinne (Mistress of the Robes): these posts were first appointed in 1817. When the union between Sweden and Norway was dissolved in 1905, a permanent Norwegian royal court was established.

Ottoman Empire

In the Ottoman Empire, the word lady-in-waiting or court lady has often been used to described those women of the Imperial Harem who functioned as servants, secretaries, and companions of the consorts (concubines), daughters, sisters and mothers of the Ottoman Sultan. These women originally came to the Harem as slaves, captured through the Crimean slave trade, the Barbary slave trade and the White slave trade. 
When they entered the Harem, they were given the position of Cariye and were all formally available as concubines to the Sultan, but if they were not chosen to share his bed, they served in a position similar to lady-in-waiting, serving the mother, concubines, sisters, and daughters of the Sultan.

The (enslaved) ladies-in-waiting of the Ottoman Imperial harem were collectively known as kalfa, of different ranks. Each royal and royal concubine had their own household staff of kalfa; a kalfa serving as the servant of the sultan himself was titled Hünkar Kalfalari.
A Hazinedar or Hazinedar Usta was a kalfa with special assignments rather than just an ordinary attendant, and were ranked under the Hazinedar Usta.
All kalfa belonging to the same household within the court were ranked under their Daire Kalfasi, who was the supervisor of the kalfa's belonging to a specific royal person. All Daire Kalfasi of the harem were rankend under the Büyük Kalfa, who in turn was the supervisor of all the Daire Kalfasi of the court. 
The highest ranked kalfa was the Saray Ustas, who supervised all the kalfa of the entire court (harem).

Poland
In early modern Poland, the queen's ladies-in-waitings were collectively referred to as the fraucimer. The queen's household mirrored that of the king, but was smaller. The queen's male courtiers were supervised by the Ochmistrz, a nobleman, and the women of her court were supervised by the chief lady-in-waiting, the Ochmistrzyni (magister curiae). The Ochmistrzyni was defined as a state office and it was the only state office in Poland prior to the partition of Poland which was held by a woman. She was always to be a noblewoman married to a nobleman of senatorial rank. The Ochmistrzyni supervised a large number of unmarried ladies-in-waiting, maids of honour. The queen's court was a larger version of the courts of the Polish magnate noblewomen, and it was the custom in the Polish nobility to send their teenage daughters to be educated as ladies-in-waitings in the household of another noblewoman or preferably the queen herself in order to receive an education and find someone to marry.

Portugal

The royal court of Portugal was influenced by the Spanish court model, after Portugal became independent of Spain and created its own royal court in 1640. 

The court register of 1896 noted the Camareira-mór as the senior of all the ladies-in-waiting of the Portuguese court, followed by the Dama Camarista Mulher do mordomo mór de S. a Rainha, and the Dama honoraria Mulher do mestre sala. All three positions were at that date occupied by one person. 
The fourth rank was the Dona camarista (there were five in 1896), and the lowest rank of ladies-in-waiting was the Dona honoraira, of which there were 21 in 1896.

Russia
In the Court of Muscovite Russia, the offices of ladies-in-waiting to the Tsarina were normally divided among the Boyarinas (widows or wives of Boyars), often from the family and relatives of the Tsarina. The first rank among the offices of the ladies-in-waiting was the Tsarina's treasurer. The second was the group of companions. The third were the royal nurses to the princes and princesses (where the nurses of the male children outranked); among the nurses, the most significant post was that of the Mamok, the head royal governess, who was normally selected from elder widows, often relatives to the Tsar or Tsarina. All offices were appointed by royal decree. The group of ladies-in-waiting were collectively above the rank of the Svetlichnaya (the Tsarina's sewing women), the Postelnitsy (the Tsarina's Chamber Women and Washing Women) and the officials who handled the affairs of the staff.

In 1722, this system was abolished and the Russian imperial court was reorganized in accordance with the reforms of Peter the Great to westernize Russia, and the old court offices of the Tsarina were replaced with court offices inspired by the German model (see lady-in-waiting of the Imperial Court of Russia).

Spain
The royal court of Castile included a group of ladies-in-waiting for the queen named Camarera in the late 13th century and early 14th century, but it was not until the 15th century that a set organisation of the ladies-in-waiting is confirmed. This characteristic organisation of the Spanish ladies-in-waiting, roughly established during the reign of Isabella I of Castile (r. 1474–1504), was kept by Isabella of Portugal, Holy Roman Empress and Queen of Spain, during the 16th century, and became the standard Spanish court model for ladies-in-waiting.

The highest rank female courtier was the Camarera Mayor de Palacio (Mistress of the Robes). This office is confirmed from the 1410s.
The second rank was shared by the Ayas (royal governess), and the Guardas (chaperones).
The third rank was the Dueñas de Honor, the married ladies-in-waiting, who were responsible for not only the unmarried Damas or Meninas (Maids of honour), but also of the female slaves and dwarfs, who were classified as courtiers and ranked before the Mozas (maids) and Lavanderas (washer women).

Sweden
The early modern Swedish court, as well as the Danish equivalent, were re-organized in the early 16th century according to the German court model, in turn inspired by the Austrian imperial court model. This model roughly organized the female noble courtiers in the class of the unmarried Hovfröken (Maid of Honour, until 1719 Hovjungfru) which could be promoted to Kammarfröken (Chief Maid of Honour, until 1719 Kammarjungfru). They were supervised by the Hovmästarinna (Court Mistress, equivalent to Mistress of the Robes), normally a married or widowed elder noblewoman. Under this class of female noble courtiers, were the non-noble female servants. They were headed by the normally married Kammarfru (Mistress of the Chamber, roughly equivalent to a Lady's Maid), often of burgher background, who supervised the group of Kammarpiga (Chamber Maids).

From the reign of Queen Christina, the Hovmästarinna was supervised by the Överhovmästarinna (Chief Court Mistress). In 1774, the post of Statsfru (Mistress of the State) was introduced, which was the title for the group of married ladies-in-waiting with a rank between the Hovmästarinna and the Kammarfröken. The Swedish court staff was reduced in size in 1873. The new court protocols of 1911 and 1954 continued this reduction, and many court posts were abolished or no longer filled.

With the exception of the Statsfru and the Överhovmästarinna, none of the titles above are in use today. At the death of Queen Louise in 1965, her Överhovmästarinna was employed by the King. From 1994, the Överhovmästarinna is the head of the court of the King rather than the Queen, while the court of the Queen is headed by the Statsfru. There is now only one Statsfru, and the other ladies-in-waiting are simply referred to as Hovdam (Court Lady). Queen Silvia of Sweden has only three Hovdamer (Court Ladies). Her chief lady-in-waiting is the Statsfru.

United Kingdom
In the Royal Households of the United Kingdom, a lady-in-waiting is a woman attending a female member of the Royal Family. Ladies-in-waiting are routinely appointed by junior female members of the Royal Family, to accompany them on public engagements and provide other support and assistance. A woman attending on a queen regnant or queen consort is also often referred to by this title (including in official notices), but is more formally styled as either Woman of the Bedchamber or Lady of the Bedchamber (depending on which of these offices she holds). 

On more formal occasions ladies in waiting wear a badge of office, which usually takes the form of a jewelled or enamelled monogram of the relevant member of the Royal Family beneath the appropriate crown or coronet, suspended from a coloured ribbon.

The senior lady of a queen's household (whether queen regnant or queen consort) is the Mistress of the Robes, who (as well as being in attendance herself on occasion) has traditionally been responsible for arranging all the duties of the queen's ladies in waiting.

Queen Elizabeth II

During the reign of Queen Elizabeth II, one of the Women of the Bedchamber was always in daily attendance; each served for a fortnight at a time, in rotation. In the Court Circular the phrase 'Lady in Waiting to the Queen' referred to the women on duty at a given time. 

The Ladies of the Bedchamber were not in daily attendance, but were called upon for more formal or important public occasions and events.

Towards the end of her reign, the ladies-in-waiting to Queen Elizabeth II were:

Mistress of the Robes
 The Duchess of Grafton served as Mistress of the Robes to Elizabeth II from 1967 until her death on 3 December 2021 (after which the position remained vacant).  

Ladies of the Bedchamber
 The Countess of Airlie was appointed in 1973 and served throughout the rest of Elizabeth II's reign. 
 The Lady Farnham served from 1987 until her death in 2021.

Women of the Bedchamber
 The Hon. Dame Mary Morrison was appointed in 1960 and served throughout the rest of Elizabeth II's reign.
 The Lady Hussey of North Bradley was also appointed in 1960, and served throughout the rest of Elizabeth II's reign.
 The Lady Elton was appointed in 1987 and served throughout the rest of Elizabeth II's reign. 
 Mrs. Robert de Pass was appointed as an Extra Woman of the Bedchamber in 1987 and served throughout the rest of Elizabeth II's reign.
 The Hon. Dame Annabel Whitehead was appointed in 2002 and served throughout the rest of Elizabeth II's reign.
 Mrs. Michael Gordon-Lennox was also appointed in 2002, and served throughout the rest of Elizabeth II's reign.

Extra ladies-in-waiting
 Lady Elizabeth Leeming (née Bowes-Lyon), a cousin of Elizabeth II.
 Mrs. Simon Rhodes, daughter-in-law of The Hon. Margaret Rhodes (a cousin of Elizabeth II and former Woman of the Bedchamber to Queen Elizabeth The Queen Mother).

After the death of Elizabeth II and the accession of Charles III, it was announced that the King would be retaining the late Queen's ladies-in-waiting, with their titles changing to "Ladies of the Household". They will help with hosting events at Buckingham Palace.

Camilla, Queen Consort 
In November 2022, it was announced that Camilla, the Queen Consort, would end the tradition of having ladies-in-waiting. Instead, she will be helped by "Queen's companions". Their role will be informal and they will not be involved in tasks such as replying to letters or developing schedules.

 her companions were:
 The Marchioness of Lansdowne
 The Baroness Chisholm of Owlpen
 Lady Sarah Keswick
 Katherine, Lady Brooke
 Jane von Westenholz
 Sarah Troughton

Historic
In the Middle Ages, Margaret of France, Queen of England is noted to have had seven ladies-in-waiting: three married ones, who were called Domina, and four unmarried maids of honour, but no principal lady-in-waiting is mentioned, and until the 15th century, the majority of the office holders of the Queen's household were still male.

As late as in the mid-15th century, Queen Elizabeth Woodville had only five ladies-in-waiting, but in the late 15th century and early 16th century, ladies-in-waiting were given a more dominant place at the English court, in parallel with developments in France and the continental courts. The court life of the Duchy of Burgundy served as an example when Edward IV created the Black Book of the Household in 1478, and the organisation of the English royal household was essentially set from that point onward.

Elizabeth of York, Queen of England had numerous ladies-in-waiting, which was reported by the Spanish ambassador, Rodrigo de Puebla, as something unusual and astonishing: "the Queen has thirty-two ladies, very magnificent and in splendid style". She reportedly had 36 ladies-in-waiting, 18 of them noblewomen; in 1502, a more complete account summarised them as 16 'gentlewomen', seven maids of honour and three 'chamberers-women', who attended to her in the bedchamber. Aside from the women formally employed as ladies-in-waiting, the Queen's female retinue in reality also consisted of the daughters and the ladies-in-waiting of her ladies-in-waiting, who also resided in the Queen's household.

The duties of ladies-in-waiting at the Tudor court were to act as companions for the queen, both in public and in private. They had to accompany her wherever she went, to entertain her with music, dance or singing and to dress, bathe and help her use the toilet, since a royal person, by the standards of the day, was not supposed to do anything for herself, but was always to be waited upon in all daily tasks as a sign of their status.

Ladies-in-waiting were appointed because of their social status as members of the nobility, on the recommendation of court officials, or other prominent citizens, and because they were expected to be supporters of the royal family due to their own family relationships. When the queen was not a foreigner, her own relations were often appointed as they were presumed to be trustworthy and loyal. Lady Margaret Lee was a Lady of the Privy Chamber to Queen Anne Boleyn, just as Lady Elizabeth Seymour-Cromwell was to Queen Jane Seymour.

The organisation of the Queen's ladies-in-waiting was set in the period of the Tudor court. The ladies-in-waiting were headed by the Mistress of the Robes, followed in rank by the First Lady of the Bedchamber, who supervised the group of Ladies of the Bedchamber (typically wives or widows of peers above the rank of Earl), in turn followed by the group of Women of the Bedchamber (usually the daughters of peers) and finally the group of maids of honour, whose service entitled them to the style of The Honourable for life.

The system had formally remained roughly the same since the Tudor period. However, in practice, many offices have since then been left vacant. For example, in recent times, maids of honour have only been appointed for coronations.

Notable examples
This is a list of particularly well known and famous ladies-in-waiting of each nation listed. More can be found in their respective category.

Austria
 Countess Sophie Chotek von Chotkow und Wognin, later Duchess of Hohenberg (1868–1914)

Canada
 Margaret Southern (b. 1931)

Denmark
 Louise Scheel von Plessen (1725–1799)

England, Scotland, Great Britain, and the United Kingdom
 Catherine Douglas (fl. 1497)
 Elizabeth Woodville (possibly; 1437–1492)
 Lady Mary Boleyn (с. 1499/1500–1543)
 Four of Henry VIII's queens consort:
 Lady Anne Boleyn (c. 1501/07–1536)
 Jane Seymour (c. 1508–1537)
 Catherine Howard (с. 1523–1542)
 Catherine Parr (1512–1548)
 Jane Boleyn, Viscountess Rochford (c. 1505–1542)
 Katherine Ashley (c. 1502–1565)
 Jane Dormer, later Duchess of Feria (1538–1612)
 Mary Fleming (1542–1581); one of the Four Marys
 Lettice Knollys (1543–1634)
 Sarah Churchill, Duchess of Marlborough (1660–1744)
 Ivy Gordon-Lennox, later Duchess of Portland (1887–1982)
 Ruth Roche, Baroness Fermoy (1908–1993)
 Lady Pamela Mountbatten (b. 1929)
 Jane Loftus, Marchioness of Ely (1821–1890)
 Lady Sarah McCorquodale (b. 1955)

France
Françoise de Brézé, Countess of Maulévrier (1515–14 October 1577); Regent of Sedan from 1553 to 1559
Jacqueline de Longwy, Countess of Bar-sur-Sein (before 1520–28 August 1561)
Henriette of Cleves, 4th Duchess of Nevers (31 October 1542 – 24 June 1601); one of France's chief creditors until her death
 Marie Thérèse Louise of Savoy, Princess of Lamballe (1749–1792)
 Yolande de Polastron (1749–1793)
 Louise-Élisabeth de Croÿ, Marchioness of Tourzel (1749–1832)

Germany
 Marie Luise von Degenfeld (1634–1677); at the court of The Palatinate
 Baroness Maria Caroline Charlotte von Ingenheim (1704–1749); at the court of Bavaria
 Sophie Marie von Voß (1729–1814); at the court of Prussia
 Charlotte von Stein (1742–1827); at the court of Saxe-Weimar
 Luise von Göchhausen (1752–1807); at the court of Saxe-Weimar
 Karoline Friederike von Berg (1760–1826); at the court of Prussia
 Gabriele von Bülow (1802–1887); chief lady-in-waiting at the court of Prussia
Rosalie von Rauch, later Countess of Hohenau (1820–1879); at the court of Prussia

Hungary
 Helene Kottanner (1400–1470); lady-in-waiting for Elisabeth of Luxembourg, she organized the abduction of the Holy Crown and nursed Elisabeth of Habsburg, who later become a Polish Queen
 Countess Irma Sztáray de Sztára et Nagymihály (1863–1940); at the court of Empress Elisabeth "Sisi" of Austria
 Countess Marie Festetics von Tolna (1839–1923); lady-in-waiting for Empress Elisabeth of Austria and Honorary Lady of the Order of Theresa
 Ida Krisztina Veronika Ferenczy of Vecseszék (1839–1928); close friend and confidant of Empress Elisabeth of Austria

Japan
 Lady Ise (875–938); poet, lover of Prince Atsuyoshi and later concubine of Emperor Uda
 Takashina no Takako (d. 996); served at the court of Empress Junshi, later the legal wife of Fujiwara no Michitaka and regent of Emperor Ichijō
Uma no Naishi (949–1011); poet, she served under Empress Kishi (wife of Emperor Murakami), Fujiwara no Senshi (the imperial consort of Emperor En'yū and mother of Emperor Ichijō) and Empress Teishi (wife of Emperor Ichijō), and later became a follower of Shōnagon
 Akazome Emon (с. 956–1041 or later); poet and writer of "Tale of Flowering Fortunes", she served at the court of Empress Shoshi
 Murasaki Shikibu (c. 978 – c. 1016/1031); poet and the writer of the first known novel, "The Tale of Genji", she also wrote a diary about court life after serving at the court of Empress Shoshi
 Sei Shōnagon (c. 966–1017/1025); writer of the Pillow Book, she served at the court of Empress Teishi
 Ise no Taifu (989–1060); poet, she served Empress Shoshi along with Murasaki Shikibu, Akazome Emon and Izumi Shikibu, and later became the nurse of Emperor Shirakawa
 Daini no Sanmi (999–1082); daughter of Murasaki Shikibu she served at court of Grand Empress Dowager Shoshi and was the nurse of Emperor Go-Reizei and the imperial princesses
 Lady Sarashina (1008–after 1059); writer of Sarashina Nikki, she served Imperial Princess Yushi, the third daughter of Emperor Go-Suzaku

Korea
 Kim Gae-si (d. 1623)
 Royal Consort Gwi-in of the Okcheon Jo clan (d. 1652)
 Jang Ok-jeong, Royal Noble Consort Hui of the Indong Jang clan (1659–1701)
 Royal Noble Consort Suk of the Haeju Choe clan (1670–1718)
 Royal Noble Consort Yeong of the Jeonui Yi clan (1696–1764)
 Royal Noble Consort Ui of the Changnyeong Seong clan (1753–1786)
 Imperial Consort Boknyeong Gwi-in of the Cheongju Yang clan (1882–1929)

China
 Lu Lingxuan (d. 577); served as the wet nurse of Emperor Gao Wei
 Sumalagu (1615–24 October 1705); palace attendant during the Qing Dynasty and close confidant of Empress Dowager Xiaozhuang
 Wei Tuan'er (d. 693); favourite lady-in-waiting of Wu Zetian
 Princess Der Ling (1885–1944); she was given the title of "commandery princess" while serving as the first lady-in-waiting for Empress Dowager Cixi
 Nellie Yu Roung Ling (1889–1973); she was given the title of "commandery princess" while serving as a lady-in-waiting for Empress Dowager Cixi

Ottoman
 Gülfem Hatun (d. 1562); supposed concubine of Sultan Suleiman I the Magnificent
 Canfeda Hatun (d. 1600); mistress housekeeper
 Hubbi Hatun (d. 1590); poetess
 Raziye Hatun (1525–26 June 1597); mistress of financial affairs
 Şahinde Hanım (née Princess Kezban Marshania; c. 1895–15 March 1924); lady-in-waiting to her aunt, Nazikeda Kadın
 Şekerpare Hatun; mistress housekeeper

Poland
 Marie Casimire Louise de La Grange d'Arquien, later Queen of Poland (1641–1716)
 Klara Izabella Pacowa (1631–1685)
 Elżbieta Helena Sieniawska (1669–1729)

Russia
 Sophia Stepanovna Razumovskaya (1746–1803); a mistress of Paul I of Russia
 Countess Julia von Hauke, later Princess of Battenberg (1825–1895)
 Anna Alexandrovna Vyrubova (1884–1964)

Sweden
 Elizabeth Ribbing (1596–1662), and later her morganatic daughter, Elizabeth Carlsdotter Gyllenhielm (1622–1682)
 Ulrika Strömfelt (1724–1780)
 Augusta von Fersen (1754–1846)
 Magdalena Rudenschöld (1766–1823)

Thailand
 Princess Vibhavadi Rangsit (1920–1977)

In fiction
The Favourite (2018 film)

Extended uses
The term "lady-in-waiting" is sometimes used as slang for "pregnant woman".

See also
 Chaperone (social)
 Handmaiden
 Lady's companion
 Lady's maid
 Manservant
 Odalisque

Notes

References

  

 
 
 
 
 
 
 
 
 — op basis van brieven en dagboken

External links

 
Gendered occupations
Women by occupation